Dried persimmon is a type of traditional dried fruit snack in East Asia. Known as shìbǐng in Chinese, hoshigaki in Japanese, and gotgam in Korean, it is traditionally made in the winter, by air drying Oriental persimmon. It is also used to make wine, put in traditional tea, and in creating other desserts.

In the Han Dynasty, Yangshao dried persimmon was used as a tribute to the imperial court.

Production 

Dried persimmon are made from various varieties of Oriental persimmon. Persimmons, when fully ripe, are thin-skinned, soft and sweet. Persimmons used to create dried persimmons are harvested when they are under-ripe, firm, astringent, and bitter.

China 
In China, there are many different varieties of dried persimmon. The traditional way of drying persimmon is to choose fruits which are fully mature. After the persimmons are peeled and blemishes have been removed, a drying rack 0.8-1m high and covered with foil is placed in an area with sufficient light, air circulation, and sanitation. The persimmons are then places stem-side up onto the rack and covered to prevent contact from rain or other environmental debris. The drying process causes the flesh to shrivel and a frosty layer to form on the surface. In addition, there are artificial drying methods, this method producing brighter-coloured persimmons. Each region in China has different production methods and dried fruit characteristics, of which Xi'an dried persimmon is more famous.

Japan 
In Japan, the fruit are peeled and then suspended by strings from their stems. They are massaged daily after they have started to dry. This gives the dried persimmon from Japan a distinctive shape and texture that is different from those from China and Korea. Anpo-gaki is a variation of Japanese dried persimmon in which the persimmon is dried by fumigating with sulphur, resulting in a soft, juicy texture.

Korea 
In Korea, the persimmons are peeled and dried, tied with saekki (rice straw ropes) and hung in sunny, well-ventilated place, for example to the eaves of the house. When the color turns brown and the outer part hardens, the seeds are removed and the persimmons are sealed again and flattened. After around three weeks, when the fruits reach 75% of their original weight, they are covered in dried rice straw and stored in a box in a cool place until the drying process is completed, and a white powdery crust of persimmon sugar forms on the outside. Sangju in North Gyeongsang Province is famous for its dried persimmons.

Nutrition 

Korean gotgam usually consists of 32% moisture, 6.3% protein, 0.44% fat, 44.8% carbohydrate, 15% fiber, and 1.99% ash.
calories (32g/ea) : 75.8kcal

Culinary use 
In Korean cuisine, dried persimmons can be consumed themselves, or used as an ingredient in other foods. For example, gotgam-ssam (dried persimmon wrap) is made by wrapping a walnut with dried persimmon. Dried persimmon with pine nuts inserted are served with suksil-gwa (a fruit confection) or fresh fruits. Dried persimmons are also one of the main ingredients for sujeonggwa (cinnamon punch).

In Japan, Hoshigaki are eaten by themselves as a quick snack or eaten with walnuts and/or with Traditional Desserts like Dango, Mochi, or Raindrop Cake.

In popular culture 
According to Chinese legend, Zhu Yuanzhang was forced to live in exile to the foot of jinweng mountain in the north of Fuping. He was able to live because he ate local dried persimmons.

The Korean folktale "The Tiger and the Dried Persimmon" features a tiger scared of dried persimmon.

Gallery

See also 
 Dried apricot
 Dried cherry
 Dried cranberry
 List of dried foods

References 

Dried fruit
Korean snack food
Persimmon